2,4,6-Tris(trinitromethyl)-1,3,5-triazine is a chemical compound that is a derivative of triazine first prepared in 1995. It is synthesized by destructive nitration of 2,4,6-tricarboxyl-1,3,5-triazine. It is noteworthy for having more nitro groups than it does carbon atoms, thus potentially being useful as an oxygen source, or added to oxygen-poor explosives to increase their power.

Derivatives have been prepared by nucleophilic displacement of the nitro groups with azide and hydrazine.

References

Triazines
Nitro compounds
Explosive chemicals